Alejandro "Álex" Bergantiños García (born 7 June 1985) is a Spanish footballer who plays for Deportivo de La Coruña as a defensive midfielder.

He spent his entire professional career contracted to Deportivo, making over 250 appearances and being loaned to several other teams. He played 118 La Liga games for Deportivo and Xerez and 247 in Segunda División for those two, Granada, Gimnàstic and Sporting Gijón.

Club career
Bergantiños was born in A Coruña. He had his first professional spell as a footballer in 2008, at already 23: loaned by local club Deportivo de La Coruña, he was an essential midfield figure as Xerez CD achieved a first-ever top flight promotion – 31 games, 21 starts and 2,085 minutes played.

In very late August 2009, after tying him to the club for four more years, Depor agreed to loan Bergantiños once again to the Andalusians, in another season-long move. He made his La Liga debut on 30 August, playing the last 30 minutes in a 2–0 away loss against RCD Mallorca, and produced roughly the same numbers than in the previous year as the Andalusians were immediately relegated.

Bergantiños moved on loan to Granada CF for the 2010–11 campaign. He left in January 2011 to begin yet another loan, at Segunda División rivals Gimnàstic de Tarragona.

Bergantiños returned to Galicia in 2011–12, and soon became a regular, appearing in all the league games and helping his team achieve promotion back to the top flight. He scored his first goal in the competition on 20 October 2012, but in a 4–5 home defeat to FC Barcelona. Weeks later, he extended his contract until 2016, with a buyout clause of €10 million. 

In September 2015, Bergantiños signed a new deal lasting until 2018. On 12 December that year, against Barcelona again but at the Camp Nou, he helped the visitors come from behind 0–2 to draw it 2–2 by netting in the 85th minute.

On 2 March 2017, in his first league game of the season, Bergantiños had an accidental collision with Fernando Torres, from which the Atlético Madrid striker suffered cranial injuries; he visited the opponent in hospital shortly afterwards. Ten days later, he scored the winner in a 2–1 victory over reigning champions Barcelona at the Estadio Riazor.

On 11 July 2017, shortly after committing himself to another year at Deportivo, Bergantiños was loaned to Sporting de Gijón for one year. Upon returning home, he became the captain.

Bergantiños remained at Deportivo following their historic relegation to Segunda División B in 2020. The 35-year-old skipper signed a new deal on 5 October that year, to last until 2022.

Career statistics

Club

Honours
Xerez
Segunda División: 2008–09

Deportivo
Segunda División: 2011–12

References

External links
Deportivo official profile 

1985 births
Living people
Spanish footballers
Footballers from A Coruña
Association football midfielders
La Liga players
Segunda División players
Segunda División B players
Tercera División players
Primera Federación players
Deportivo Fabril players
Deportivo de La Coruña players
Xerez CD footballers
Granada CF footballers
Gimnàstic de Tarragona footballers
Sporting de Gijón players